Potarje is a settlement in the Municipality of Tržič in the Upper Carniola region of Slovenia.

References

External links
Potarje at Geopedia

Populated places in the Municipality of Tržič